VLDB may refer to:

 Very large databases
 VLDB conference, an annual database conference